Deep Shag Records is an American record label started in 2000 by Michael Reed. The label is known for the On the Road With Ellison series of releases by Harlan Ellison and for re-issuing rare 1980's modern rock, new wave, comedy, and spoken word albums which were previously unavailable on CD.

History
The founder of Deep Shag Records, Michael Reed, began the label out of a love of records and frustration that certain titles in his personal collection had not been brought into the digital age. Fearing that the cherished music, comedy, and spoken word releases of his youth would be lost to history, Reed relied upon his 15 years of experience in the music industry to create a new home for these almost forgotten gems.

In 2001, Deep Shag was fortunate enough to secure the rights to the rare 1982 spoken word album On the Road with Ellison Volume 1 by noted author and raconteur Harlan Ellison. The release was a great success and Deep Shag was granted access to the author's vast audio archive. The series resumed in 2005 with On the Road with Ellison Volume 2 some 23 years after the original vinyl release of the first volume.

Overview
Deep Shag Records is headquartered in Atlanta, Georgia and continues on a mission to be a label that "refuses to sit in just one section of your collection."

Artists

Harlan Ellison
Peter Himmelman
Sussman Lawrence
The Frantics
Stress
Assassin
Fish Karma

Release history

External links

Deep Shag Records on Facebook

American independent record labels